The canton of Méru is an administrative division of the Oise department, northern France. Its borders were modified at the French canton reorganisation which came into effect in March 2015. Its seat is in Méru.

It consists of the following communes:
 
Amblainville 
Andeville
Belle-Église
Bornel
Chambly
Dieudonné
Ercuis
Esches
Fresnoy-en-Thelle
Lormaison
Méru
Neuilly-en-Thelle
Puiseux-le-Hauberger
Villeneuve-les-Sablons

References

Cantons of Oise